Homalictus blackburni is an Australian species of sweat bee found in moist coastal regions of Queensland and the Northern Territory. Like most halictid bees they nest underground where they provision their larvae with pollen. Homalictus blackburni are shiny black which contrasts with the colour of pollen collected. It was first described by Cockerell in 1910.

Gallery

References

Halictidae
Insects described in 1910